Out of the Fog may refer to:

Out of the Fog (1919 film), starring Alla Nazimova
Out of the Fog (1941 film), a 1941 film noir featuring John Garfield and Ida Lupino
Out of the Fog (1962 film), British film about an ex-con accused of a series of murders (called Fog for a Killer in the USA)
Out of the Fog, a talk show on Rogers TV in Newfoundland and Labrador, Canada